"Foolproof" is a song by Australian singer and music producer Hayden James, English production duo Gorgon City and Australian singer Nat Dunn. It was released on 19 March 2021.

The official visualiser was released on 19 March 2021.

At the 2022 Queensland Music Awards, the release won Electronic / Dance Award and Regional / Remote Award.

Critical reception
Alex Gallagher from NME said "The anthemic house cut is anchored by Dunn's soaring vocals, which float above hypnotic beats and deep bass." Brian Bonavoglia from DJ Times called the song "a sultry dancefloor filler with pop sensibilities" and "an infectious house hit ready to rock club systems or dominate the radio airwaves."

Track listing
Digital download
 "Foolproof" – 4:27

Digital download
 "Foolproof" (LP Giobbi remix) - 3:17
 "Foolproof" – 4:27

Charts

Weekly charts

Year-end charts

References

2021 songs
2021 singles
Hayden James songs
Gorgon City songs
Songs written by Hayden James
Songs written by Nat Dunn
Songs written by Kye Gibbon
Songs written by Matt Robson-Scott